Atay Dzhumashev (born 15 September 1998) is a Kyrgyzstani professional footballer who plays as a forward for I-League club Rajasthan United.

Club career
Dzhumashev began his senior club career at Abdysh-Ata Kant in 2017 with moving to Neftchi Kochkor-Ata on a loan spell in 2018. Dzhumashev enjoyed a fruitful 2022 campaign with Abdysh-Ata Kant in the Kyrgyzstan Premier League since his return to the club in 2021. He found the back of the net 14 times and provided six assists in 26 league matches.

On 5 January 2023, Dzhumashev signed with Indian I-League side Rajasthan United on a season-long deal.

International career
Dzhumashev made his senior international debut for the Kyrgyzstan national team on 2 September 2021 in their 1–0 victory over Palestine. He was later named in the matchday squad for their friendly against Tajikistan in March.

Career statistics

Club

References

External links 
 
 

1998 births
Living people
Kyrgyzstani footballers
Kyrgyzstani expatriate footballers
Expatriate footballers in Belarus
Kyrgyzstani expatriate sportspeople in Belarus
Expatriate footballers in India
Kyrgyzstani expatriate sportspeople in India
Association football midfielders
FC Abdysh-Ata Kant players
FC Energetik-BGU Minsk players
Rajasthan United FC players